This list of mines in the United States is subsidiary to the list of mines article and lists working, defunct and future mines in the country and is organised by the primary mineral output. For practical purposes stone, marble and other quarries may be included in this list.

Coal

Copper

Diamond

Gold

Iron

Lithium
Bessemer City mine

Manganese
Batesville mine
Cuyuna Range mine

References